Trinity Catholic College in Auburn is a dual-campus independent Roman Catholic co-educational secondary day school, located in the inner western suburbs of Auburn and Regents Park, in Sydney, New South Wales, Australia.  Students in Years 7 and 8 are located at the Regents Park campus, and students from Years 9 to 12 are located at the Auburn campus. The college follows the religious tradition of the Marist Brothers, founded in 1817 by French priest and saint Marcellin Champagnat.

History
Trinity Catholic College was founded in 1995 from an amalgamation of three schools: Benedict College, Auburn, St John's Regional College for Girls, Auburn and St Peter Chanel Girls’ High, Regents Park. The Sydney Archdiocesan Catholic Schools Board decided to constitute a single new co-educational College to operate on two campuses in 1992.

The tradition of the Marist Brothers was established in 1942 with the foundation of a boys’ school at Auburn, which eventually became the senior Secondary school of the district, Benedict College. The Sisters of Charity, the first religious sisters to work in Australia, began a school at Auburn in 1893, which became St John's Regional College for Girls. The inspiration of St Mary of the Cross as one of the college's saints was handed down in St Peter Chanel Girls’ High at Regents Park, founded in 1953 by the Sisters of St Joseph.

Principals
The following individuals have served as Principal of Trinity Catholic College:

HSC results
In 2013, 1% of the HSC courses provided were above state average. In 2014, 83% of the HSC courses provided were above state average, and in 2015, 81% of the HSC courses were above state average. These results place Trinity Catholic College among the highest performing schools in the Roman Catholic Archdiocese of Sydney. The school ranked 206th in NSW in 2018, in terms of HSC results. In 2019, the school was ranked 223rd in NSW for their HSC results.

Sports and extracurricular activities 
Sports is a part of the curriculum at Trinity Catholic College. All students participate in a sport program each Thursday afternoon as well as having the opportunity to participate in a number of whole-school sporting carnivals.

The college is a member of both the (MCSA) and the Metropolitan Combined Catholic Schools' Association (MCCS), which hold competitions for a variety of sports for both boys and girls. The MCS provides inter-school competition sports such as athletics, basketball, cricket, cross country, golf, rugby league, soccer, softball, squash, swimming, tennis, touch football, and volleyball. The MCCS provides inter-school competition in athletics, volleyball, swimming, softball, soccer, tennis, netball, touch football, basketball, hockey, and chess.

Trinity Catholic College also participates in REMAR, and various other external initiatives, for the purpose of creating a spiritual bond with their Catholic faith. Students have the opportunity to engage in World Youth Day, Youth Camps and reflection days.

Notable alumni 
Junior Langi – former New Zealand rugby league player for the St George Illawarra Dragons, Melbourne Storm, Parramatta Eels and Salford City Reds
Salim Mehajer - Australian property developer and former deputy mayor of Auburn City Council
Mark Milligan – Australian football player who plays for Melbourne Victory in the A-League
Daniel Tupou – currently playing for the Sydney Roosters in the National Rugby League

See also 

 List of Catholic schools in New South Wales
 Catholic education in Australia

References

External links 
  Trinity Catholic College website

Catholic secondary schools in Sydney
Association of Marist Schools of Australia
Educational institutions established in 1995
1995 establishments in Australia
Auburn, New South Wales
Roman Catholic Archdiocese of Sydney